500 Years: Life in Resistance is a 2017 American documentary film directed by Pamela Yates about the trial of Guatemalan dictator Efraín Ríos Montt for genocide against the country's indigenous Maya population in the 1980s and the popular uprising that followed the trial, which led to the toppling of President Otto Perez Molina.

The film was screened at the Sundance and London Human Rights Watch Film Festivals, and Seattle International Film Festival. It is the third film in a three film trilogy which also includes When the Mountains Tremble and Granito: How to Nail a Dictator. Its soundtrack features the music of the indigenous Guatemalan musician Sara Curruchich.

References

External links

2017 films
2010s Spanish-language films
2017 documentary films
American documentary films
Documentary films about human rights
Documentary films about Latin American military dictatorships
Spanish-language American films
2010s American films